Real Good Time is the second studio album by Australian singer Judah Kelly. The album was released through Universal Music Australia on 5 October 2018.

Upon release Kelly said "For me it is about setting up an actual career now. For me this is the first album. It's not just The Voice Australia winning dude, it's a Judah Kelly album." When asked to describe the music on the album, he said "I would say this album is a blend of country and blues I guess. The last album was too country for a pop audience and too pop for a country audience. With this one there's no doubt where it sits."

Track listing

Charts

Release history

References

2018 albums
Universal Music Australia albums